Morris Heights station (also known as Morris Heights–West 177th Street station) is a commuter rail stop on the Metro-North Railroad's Hudson Line, serving the Morris Heights neighborhood of the Bronx, New York City.

The station is located in the narrow strip of land between the Major Deegan Expressway and the Harlem River, next to Roberto Clemente State Park. It is also located across from the Dr. Roland N. Patterson School complex, which was built over the tracks between the bridges for Harlem River Park Drive and West Tremont Avenue.

The station has operated since the days of the Spuyten Duyvil and Port Morris Railroad as well as the New York and Putnam Railroad late in the 19th century,  though not in its present form.

Station layout
The station has one narrow, 4-car-long high-level island platform accessible from West Tremont Avenue (West 177th Street).

References

External links 

 West Tremont Avenue entrance from Google Maps Street View

Metro-North Railroad stations in New York City
Former New York Central Railroad stations
Railway stations in the Bronx
Morris Heights, Bronx